Linga is a village in Balaghat District, Jabalpur Division in the Indian state of Madhya Pradesh. It is located about 8 km from Balaghat and 391 km from Bhopal. Balaghat, Wara Seoni, Gondiya, are the nearby cities.

Linga is surrounded by Kirnapur Tehsil towards South, Waraseoni Tehsil towards west, Lalbarra Tehsil towards west, Khairlanji Tehsil towards west.

The primary languages are Hindi and Marathi. The village is 309 meters above sea level.

Religion 

The village has an ancient "Lingeshwara Shiva Linga" temple and is therefore, known as "Linga". The village has other places of religious importance, such as Maa Sharda temple, Maa Sinhawahini temple, Shree Bajrang Temple, Gram Devi "Maai", Baba Hajrat Ali Shah Warsi Majar (Warsiya Anand Ashram), and Budh Vihar.

Transport

Linga is connected to Balaghat by road, by rail (Balaghat Junction Railway Station and Kanhadgaon Railway Station). Gondia, Jabalpur, Nagpur & Durg Railway Station are other major railway station near Linga.

Education
 
 Govt Higher Secondary School 
 Govt Middle School 
 Govt  Primary School 
 Saraswati Shishu Mandir 
 Saraswati Vidhya Niketan 
 Shree Ram Shishu Mandir 
 Saraswati Computer Education Institute 
 Shree Balaji Computer Education Institute 
 Little World Public School

References 

Villages in Balaghat district